The Gaspar Museum is an art museum in Arlon, in the Luxembourg province of Belgium.
The museum is dedicated to the art of sculptor Jean-Marie Gaspar (1861–1931) and the work of his brother, photographer  (1871–1950), who were both born in Arlon. The museum also has a collection of regional art, including the 16th-century  originally from the village Fisenne. In addition, the museum hosts temporary art exhibitions. The museum building is a former bank, built in the 19th century, which at one point belonged to the Gaspar family. Since 1954 the building is owned by the city of Arlon.

References

External links
Official site (in French and Dutch)

Art museums and galleries in Belgium
Museums in Luxembourg (Belgium)
Arlon